Dana Williams may refer to:
 Dana Williams (baseball), American baseball player
 Dana Williams (singer), American singer-songwriter, guitarist, and poet
 Dana A. Williams, scholar of African American literature and university administrator